The Song Book is an album by American jazz saxophonist Booker Ervin featuring performances recorded in 1964 for the Prestige label.

Reception
The Allmusic review by Scott Yanow awarded the album 4 stars and stated " Ervin and his quartet come up with fresh interpretations of the warhorses. Booker Ervin never sounded like anyone else".

Track listing
 "The Lamp Is Low" (Peter de Rose, Mitchell Parish, Maurice Ravel, Bert Shefter) - 7:16
 "Come Sunday" (Duke Ellington) - 5:39
 "All the Things You Are" (Oscar Hammerstein II, Jerome Kern) - 5:21
 "Just Friends" (John Klenner, Sam M. Lewis) - 5:56
 "Yesterdays" (Otto Harbach, Jerome Kern) - 7:44
 "Love Is Here to Stay" (George Gershwin, Ira Gershwin) - 6:27

Personnel
Booker Ervin - tenor saxophone
Tommy Flanagan - piano
Richard Davis - bass
Alan Dawson - drums

References

Prestige Records albums
Booker Ervin albums
1964 albums
Albums recorded at Van Gelder Studio
Albums produced by Don Schlitten